Chudinovo is a rural locality (a village) in Gorod Vyazniki, Vyaznikovsky District, Vladimir Oblast, Russia. The population was 1,310 as of 2010. There are 10 streets.

Geography 
Chudinovo is located 7 km west of Vyazniki (the district's administrative centre) by road. Pervomaysky is the nearest rural locality.

References 

Rural localities in Vyaznikovsky District